Rhubarb Radio may refer to:

Rhubarb Radio (Birmingham), a radio station in the West Midlands, England
Rhubarb Radio (Wakefield), a radio station in Yorkshire, England